Kargapolye is the name of several inhabited localities in Kargopolsky District of Kurgan Oblast, Russia.

Urban localities
Kargapolye (urban-type settlement), an urban-type settlement under district jurisdiction

Rural localities
Kargapolye (rural locality), a settlement in Maysky Selsoviet